Petra Born (born 1 August 1965 in Zweibrücken, Rhineland-Palatinate) is a German former ice dancer. With partner Rainer Schönborn, she was a three-time German national champion and the 1985 European bronze medalist. They placed 9th at the 1984 Winter Olympics. They represented the club ERCH Zweibrücken and later the club Würzburger ERV. Their coach was Martin Skotnicky.

Results
(with Rainer Schönborn)

References
 
 ISU statistics

1965 births
Living people
German female ice dancers
Figure skaters at the 1984 Winter Olympics
Olympic figure skaters of West Germany
European Figure Skating Championships medalists
People from Zweibrücken